Dasyophthalma vertebralis is a butterfly of the family Nymphalidae. It is found in Brazil (Minas Gerais and Espírito Santo). The habitat consists of forests.

References

Butterflies described in 1869
Morphinae
Fauna of Brazil
Nymphalidae of South America
Taxa named by Arthur Gardiner Butler